Gyulludara is an abandoned village in the Lori Province of Armenia.

Population

References

External links 

Former populated places in Lori Province